The twentieth season of the American animated sitcom South Park premiered on Comedy Central on September 14, 2016, and ended on December 7, 2016, containing ten episodes. As with most seasons of the show, all episodes are written and directed by series co-creator and co-star Trey Parker.

Like the previous two seasons, this season features an episode-to-episode continuity, but unlike the previous two, the continuity is more linear, as if the whole season is one story arc. This season featured recurring themes focusing on Internet trolls, nostalgia, and the 2016 United States presidential election. 

This season also had planned "dark weeks", weeks where no new episodes would air, which has been done since the 19th season. These were after episode three, episode six, and episode eight.

Marketing
To promote the season, Comedy Central had mobile billboards placed in key locations in seven cities around the United States. Each billboard featured an image from the series that bore a connection to the location in which it was placed.

In Los Angeles, a billboard was placed in front of the headquarters of the Church of Scientology, which was parodied in the controversial 2005 episode "Trapped in the Closet".
In Washington, D.C., a billboard was placed in front of the Lincoln Memorial and the White House. It featured Barack and Michelle Obama, whose relationship was parodied in the 2008 episode "About Last Night..."
In Lakewood, Colorado, a billboard was placed in front of the city's Casa Bonita restaurant, which was a central plot point of the 2003 episode "Casa Bonita".
In Salt Lake City, Utah, a billboard was placed in front of the headquarters of the LDS Church, which was parodied in the 2003 episode "All About Mormons".
In Menlo Park, California, a billboard was placed in front of the headquarters of Facebook, which was parodied in the 2010 episode "You Have 0 Friends".
In New York City, a billboard was placed in front of the campaign headquarters of Donald Trump and Hillary Clinton, whose presidential campaigns were parodied in this season's premiere "Member Berries", and "Where My Country Gone?"
In Buffalo, New York, a billboard was placed in front at the United States' border with Canada, whose culture and relationship with the United States has been parodied in the feature film South Park: Bigger, Longer & Uncut, and various episodes such as "Royal Pudding" and "Where My Country Gone?"

All of the billboards included the caption "We've Been There." In some of the locations, personnel of the organizations were displeased to have the billboards outside their locations and asked the billboard operators to leave, including the Los Angeles and both Washington, D.C landmarks. Comedy Central's Chief Marketing Officer Walter Levitt stated, "That was all expected, and we completely understand why. We knew it was risky. We did this stunt because we thought it was a great way to remind South Park fans of all the amazing moments of the past 19 seasons and truly a perfect way to celebrate the 20th season."

Episodes

Reception
The season received mixed reviews from critics and fans. Jesse Schedeen with IGN rated the entire season an 8.4 out of 10, noting "Season 20 proved that South Park has lost none of its edge over the years, as the show targeted everything from Donald Trump to the dangerous allure of nostalgia. Though the finale failed to properly tie everything together, South Parks ability to adapt and course-correct to real-world developments served it well this year."

Home media
This season was released in its entirety on DVD and Blu-ray on June 13, 2017.

References

External links
 Press release from South Park Studios for Season 20

2016 American television seasons
2016 United States presidential election in popular culture
Works about cyberbullying
Denmark in fiction
Internet trolling
Nostalgia television in the United States
Parodies of Donald Trump in South Park